This is a list of Crayon Shin-chan episodes that aired from 2002 to 2011.

Episodes

2002

2003

2004

2005

2006

2007

2008

2009

2010

2011

References

https://www.tv-asahi.co.jp/shinchan/contents/story/index2011.html

Crayon Shin-chan
Crayon Shin-chan